Peter Randall may refer to:

 Peter Randall (British Army soldier) (1930–2007), British Army sergeant and recipient of the George Medal
 Peter Ralph Randall (born 1935), anti-apartheid publisher and academic from South Africa
 William Peter Randall (born 1964), aka W. Peter Randall, musician and politician from Canada
 General Peter Randall, a fictional character in the video game Prototype